2AM is an American film production and management company founded in 2021 by Christine D'Souza Gelb, David Hinojosa, and Kevin Rowe. The company is best known for producing films such as Bodies Bodies Bodies (2022), The Starling Girl (2023), and Past Lives (2023).

History
In February 2021, Christine D'Souza Gelb, David Hinojosa, and Kevin Rowe launched 2AM a production and management company with financial backing from A24. The company's first film Bodies Bodies Bodies directed by Halina Reijn was released in August 2022.

On the management side, the company represents Reijn, A.V. Rockwell, Janicza Bravo, Jeremy O. Harris, Sonoya Mizuno, Elegance Bratton, Laurel Parmet, Matt Spicer, Adam Bessa and Amelia Ullman, among others.

Filmography

2020s

Upcoming

References

External links
 

American companies established in 2021
Film production companies of the United States
Entertainment companies established in 2021
American independent film studios